The Mittelsteine concentration camp was a Nazi Arbeitslager or slave-labour camp functional on the territory of Nazi Germany during the latter part of the Second World War.It was originally established in 1942, but was operated formally for 250 days (8 months and a week) between 23 August 1944 and 30 April 1945 (the latter being the date of its liquidation) as an all-female subcamp of Gross-Rosen.

Overview

Inmates and staff
The detainees at the camp included primarily women of Jewish background deported from Hungary and Poland.  The number of inmates av­e­rag­ed at 300, or 400, while towards the end of the War the total swelled to nearly 1,000.  The function of camp commandant or Lagerkommandant (a position sometimes denominated Zwischen­ge­schaltet­er SS-Offizier or "SS liaison officer") was performed by SS-Hauptsturmführer Paul Radschun. The Ober­auf­seherin or "senior overseer" (the highest female official) was Erna Rinke. The staff included 1015 female guards. Among the most notorious of them are men­tion­ed the names of the Auf­seherinnen Philomena Locker (sen­tenc­ed after the War to seven years' imprisonment), Charlotte Neugebauer, and Schneider (first name unknown).

Location

Despite its picturesque geographical location in the so-called Steine Depression (Obniżenie Ścinawki) between the Table Moun­tains and the Stone Moun­tains and its history reaching back to the 14th century, Mittelsteine was before the Second World War a highly industrialized village.  The hamlet was, for example, the site of a major power plant that supplied electricity to the electrified Silesian grid (the Elektrischer Bahnbetrieb in Schlesien) of the German railway system (see pic­ture below) considered one of the most valuable assets of the Reich. It was a major railway junction already in the 19th century. Mittelsteine was thus a natural choice for the location of various industries.

The camp

The camp consisted of three barracks located by the north-western side of the exit road leading out of the village towards Ratno Dolne (Ger., Nieder­rathen)  the present-day Voivodeship Route (or DW)  locally called the ulica Piłsudskiego  about 600 metres from the bridge on the River Steine (present-day Ścinawka) in the direction away from the village centre on the right­-hand side. The prisoners were marched under armed guard back and forth along village streets between their places of forced labour and the camp. The forced labour involved primarily work for the ar­ma­ments and munitions manufacturer Totex, a subsidiary of Metall­waren­fabrik Spree­werk GmbH, itself owned by the Deutsche Industrie­-Werke AG (DIWAG), and for other DIWAG munitions concerns located at Mittel­steine, and at the aviation-parts factory Fa. Albert Patin, Werk­stätten für Fern­steuerungs­technik (whose location within the village is today uncertain). Con­tem­porary German accounts suggest the Albert Patin factory was located within 15 minutes' walk of the railway sta­tion. The inmates' slave labour was specifically related to the man­u­fac­ture of component parts of the V-1 and V-2 rockets  components which were being secretly pro­duc­ed in the factory installed in the converted cotton mill (die Baum­woll­spinnerei) of Schiminsky & Co. (The factory is said to have been connected by a tunnel with the Kłodzko Fortress where a similar factory manned by slave labour was in operation.)

Prisoners unable to work because of serious illness were removed from the camp to be executed off premises, as were those in advanced stages of pregnancy. In the latter stages of the camp's existence in 1945 a number of prisoners who fell ill were allowed to die without medical care in the camp's Revier or isolation ward.

With the defeat looming in the last months and weeks of the War the Nazis liquidated the camp and transferred the prisoners to two alternative slave-labour sites according to the following selection process: the Hungarian nationals were sent to the preexisting camp of Mährisch Weisswasser in Bílá Voda in the Sudetenland, while the Polish na­tion­als were sent to the newly created camp at Grafenort in Germany (now Gorzanów in Poland) at a distance of 27 kilometres from Mittel­steine. As Bella Gutterman, the director of the International Institute for Holocaust Research, comments on these ultimate developments, by 1945 the decisions of the Nazis with regard to the Mittelsteine camp "fol­low­ed no evident logic". However, the inexplicable dénouement may be linked to the fact that, with the advances of the Allied forces on the Eastern Front, the Nazis rapidly halted the secret production of the V-1 and V-2 rocket components at Mittelsteine, dismantled the specialized machinery used for the purpose and shipped it out of the region.

Post-war developments and testimonials

The victims
Among the several memoirs published by former inmates during the post-War period, the most detailed description of the camp, according to experts, is that offered by Sara Selver-Urbach in her book Through the Window of My Home published in Israel in 1964. Selver-Urbach writes, in part,...life in Mittelsteine was sheer hell, even if a lesser hell than elsewhere, and our portion of torments and suffering was undoubtedly an indivisible part of that total, com­pre­hensive system I have labelled "A Different Planet"...Another former inmate, Ruth Minsky Sender, who in her 1986 book The Cage vividly conveys the pervasive atmosphere of terror established at Mittelsteine by the random use of torture, speaks in the in­ter­views of the suicides among the despairing inmates.

The perpetrators
However, the owner of the chief among the slave-labour enterprises at Mittelsteine, the industrialist and inventor Albert Patin, instead of being prosecuted for war crimes after the War had ended, was brought in 1945  together with his family which followed in 1946  to the United States (initially to New York City) and subsequently provided with housing at U.S. Gov­ern­ment's expense at Wright Field (near Riverside, Ohio) in a bid to wrest Luftwaffe secrets out of him, even as a bidding war raged among the British and the French in­tel­li­gence agencies as to who would make the most attractive offer to entice him to their side.  These events took place at precisely the time when the Nuremberg Tribunal  of which the United States was one of the four constitutive powers  was defining in the strict sense as war crimes, in Article 6(b) of its 1945 Char­ter, violations of the laws and customs of war that included but were not limited toill-treatment or deportation to slave labour or for any other purpose of civilian population of or in occupied territory, murder or ill-treatment of prisoners...Georg Schwarzenberger, International Law as applied by International Courts and Tribunals, vol. 2 (The Law of Armed Conflict), London, Stevens & Sons Ltd., 1968, p. 231.

Current status

According to Polish press reports, the cotton mill that used to house the slave-labour factory, which until 1991 had been a running concern as a subsidiary of the (now de­funct) state-owned Piast cotton mill (the Zakłady Przemysłu Bawełnianego "Piast") of Głuszyca, in 1992 became a private enterprise under the name of Raftom, and has since fallen victim to unscrupulous real-estate speculators and is being dismantled. There is no evidence of any official attempts to preserve or commemorate this major Holocaust site.

The Mittelsteine concentration camp has been formally recognized by the government of the Third Polish Republic as a place of martyrdom by the decree (roz­po­rzą­dze­nie) of the Prime Minister of the Republic of Poland of 20 September 2001 promulgated in the official statute book, the Dziennik Ustaw (Dz.U.2001.106.1154), as a legal tech­ni­cal­i­ty resorted to for the purposes of including former Mittelsteine in­mates within the category of persons eligible for special care and protection of the Polish State as vet­e­rans and/or victims of Nazi or Communist re­pres­sions  a class of persons previously established by the Veterans and Certain Victims of Repressions Act of 24 January 1991 (Dz.U.1997.142.950).

Notable inmates
Marietta Moskin, Vienna-born American children's book author (19282011)
Sara Selver-Urbach, writer
Ruth Minsky Sender, writer
Sara Zyskind, writer

Bibliography
Obozy hitlerowskie na ziemiach polskich 19391945: informator encyklopedyczny, ed. Cz. Pilichowski, et al. (for the Główna Komisja Badania Zbrodni Hitlerowskich w Polsce and the Rada Ochrony Pomników Walki i Męczeństwa), Warsaw, Państwowe Wydawnictwo Naukowe, 1979, p. 509.  .
Roman Mogilanski, comp. & ed., The Ghetto Anthology: A Comprehensive Chronicle of the Extermination of Jewry in Nazi Death Camps and Ghettos in Poland, rev. B. Grey, Los Angeles, American Congress of Jews from Poland and Survivors of Concentration Camps, 1985, page 246.
Augustin Rösch, Kampf gegen den Nationalsozialismus, ed. R. Bleistein, Frankfurt am Main, Knecht, 1985, page 244. .
Encyclopedia of the Holocaust, ed. I. Gutman, vol. 4, New York, Macmillan Publishing Company, 1990, pages 625, 1862. .
Enzyklopädie des Holocaust: die Verfolgung und Ermordung der europäischen Juden, ed. E. Jäckel, et al., vol. 1, Berlin, Argon, 1993, page 571. , .
Women in the Holocaust: A Collection of Testimonies, comp. & tr. J. Eibeshitz & A. Eilenberg-Eibeshitz, vol. 2, Brooklyn (New York), Re­mem­ber, 1994, pages 67, 204205. , .
Benjamin and Vladka Meed Registry of Jewish Holocaust Survivors, vol. 2, Washington, D.C., United States Holocaust Memorial Council in cooperation with the American Gathering of Jewish Holocaust Survivors, 1996, pages 267268. .
Studia nad Faszyzmem i Zbrodniami Hitlerowskimi, ed. K. Jonca, vol. 22 (2136), Wrocław, Wydawnictwo Uniwersytetu Wrocławskiego, 1999, page 375. . ISSN 0239-6661, ISSN 0137-1126. (An extremely important source.)
Jan Kosiński, Niemieckie obozy koncentracyjne i ich filie, ed. W. Sobczyk, Stephanskirchen near Rosenheim, Drukania Polska Kontrast, 1999. .
Edward Basałygo, 900 lat Jeleniej Góry: Tędy przeszła historia: Kalendarium wydarzeń w Kotlinie Jeleniogórskiej i jej okolicach, Jelenia Góra, 2010. (See online.)
Andrzej Strzelecki, Deportacja Żydów z getta łódzkiego do KL Auschwitz i ich zagłada: opracowanie i wybór źródeł, ed. T. Świebocka, Oświęcim, Państwowe Muzeum Auschwitz-Birkenau, 2004. .
Filie obozu koncentracyjnego Gross-Rosen: informator, Wałbrzych, Muzeum Gross-Rosen, 2008, pp. 35, 5154. .
Bella Gutterman, A Narrow Bridge to Life: Jewish Forced Labor and Survival in the Gross-Rosen Camp System, 19401945, tr. IBRT, New York, Berghahn Books, 2008. , .
The United States Holocaust Memorial Museum Encyclopedia of Camps and Ghettos, 1933–1945, ed. Geoffrey P. Megargee, vol. 1 (Early Camps, Youth Camps, and Concentration Camps and Subcamps under the SS-Business Administration Main Office (WVHA)), Bloomington, Indiana, Indiana University Press, in association with the United States Holocaust Memorial Museum, 2009, pages xiii, 700, 757, 765766, 1573, 1624. .

See also
Gross-Rosen concentration camp
List of subcamps of Gross Rosen
List of Nazi-German concentration camps
History of children in the Holocaust
Operation Paperclip

References

External links
The remains of the Mittelsteine cotton mill converted to a slave-labour factory that produced V-1 and V-2 rocket components (a picture purporting to show demolition of the premises on 11 September 2012)
The remains of the Mittelsteine cotton mill converted to a slave-labour factory that produced V-1 and V-2 rocket components (May 2011)
The remains of the Mittelsteine cotton mill converted to a slave-labour factory that produced V-1 and V-2 rocket components (April 2012)
The remains of the Mittelsteine cotton mill converted to a slave-labour factory that produced V-1 and V-2 rocket components (September 2012)
The remains of the Mittelsteine cotton mill converted to a slave-labour factory that produced V-1 and V-2 rocket components (April 2012)
A gallery of Mittelsteine photos  past and present

1942 establishments in Germany
1945 disestablishments in Poland
German V-2 rocket facilities
Gross-Rosen concentration camp
V-1 flying bomb facilities
World War II sites in Poland
Nazi concentration camps in Poland